The following is a list of islands of Central America.

Islands
 Islands of Belize
Inner Islands
Ambergris Caye
Blackadore Caye
Cayo Espanto
Caye Caulker
Caye Chapel
Goff's Caye
 Islands of Costa Rica
 Islands of El Salvador
 Islands of Guatemala
 Islands of Honduras
 Islands of Nicaragua
 Islands of Panama

See also

 Central America
 Belize
 Costa Rica
 El Salvador
 Guatemala
 Honduras
 Nicaragua
 Panama
 List of Central America-related topics
 List of islands
 List of islands in the Caribbean
 List of islands of North America
 List of islands of South America

External links
 World island information @ WorldIslandInfo.com

 
Islands
Central America